Oímbra is a municipality in the Spanish province of Ourense. It has a population of 1,894 (2016) and an area of 72 km². It is located to the north of the border with Portugal.

Oímbra is, in this moment, the municipality of Galicia which has the biggest number of documented rock winepresses, this tells us the historical and extraordinary condition of its climate and soils for grape cultivation and quality wine production

References  

Municipalities in the Province of Ourense